Etofibrate is a fibrate. It is a combination of clofibrate and niacin, linked together by an ester bond. In the body, clofibrate and niacin separate and are released gradually, in a manner similar to controlled-release formulations.

References

Fibrates
Prodrugs
Chloroarenes
Phenol ethers
Nicotinate esters